The following table indicates the parties of elected officials in the U.S. state of South Carolina:
Governor
Lieutenant Governor
Secretary of State
Attorney General
Treasurer
Comptroller General
Superintendent of Education
Adjutant General (no longer elected after 2014; appointed by governor beginning in 2019)
Commissioner of Agriculture

The table also indicates the historical party composition in the:
State Senate
State House of Representatives
State delegation to the U.S. Senate
State delegation to the U.S. House of Representatives
For years in which a presidential election was held, the table indicates which party's nominees received the state's electoral votes.

Bold indicates present office holders.

1776–1864

1865–present

See also
Government and politics in South Carolina
Politics of South Carolina
Elections in South Carolina

References

Politics of South Carolina
Government of South Carolina
South Carolina